Teen Scene is the twenty-first studio album by American guitarist Chet Atkins, released in 1963. It was nominated for the 1964 Best Rock and Roll Recording Grammy but did not win. It reached No. 93 on the Billboard Pop Albums charts. The album is out of print although some tracks can be found on compilation CDs.

Track listing

Side one
 "I Got a Woman" (Ray Charles, Richard) – 2:20
 "Rumpus" (Shurelon J. Jones) – 2:03
 "I Love How You Love Me" (Barry Mann, Larry Kolber) – 2:00
 "Alley Cat" (Frank Bjorn) – 2:19
 "Walk Right In" (Gus Cannon, Hosea Woods) – 2:08
 "(Back Home Again in) Indiana" (James Hanley, Ballard MacDonald) – 2:16

Side two
 "Teen Scene" (Atkins, Jerry Reed) – 1:56
 "Sweetie Baby" (Roye Lee, Chet Rose) – 2:19
 "Little Evil" (Jerry Snook) – 1:57
 "I Will" (Dick Glasser) – 2:30
 "Bye Bye Birdie" (Lee Adams, Charles Strouse) – 2:27
 "Susie Q" (Eleanor Broadwater, Dale Hawkins, Stan Lewis) – 2:14

Personnel
Chet Atkins – guitar
Bill Porter – engineer

References

1963 albums
Chet Atkins albums
Albums produced by Anita Kerr
RCA Victor albums